7q11.23 duplication syndrome (also called dup7 or Duplication of the Williams-Beuren Syndrome Critical Region) is a rare genetic syndrome caused by micro-duplication of 1.5-1.8 mega base in section q11.23 of chromosome 7.

This syndrome is characterized by a wide spectrum of neurological, behavior and other medical problems which may appear in different levels of severity. Common characteristics are speech and sound disorder (CAS - childhood apraxia of speech, dysarthria), delayed development, delayed motor development and clumsiness, anxiety (especially on social conditions), selective mutism (in 20% of the subjects),  ADHD, oppositional disorder, ASD (in 20%), intellectual disability in 18%, cardio-vascular disease (dilation of the ascending aorta in 46%), seizures in 19%,  neurological abnormalities (hypotonia, adventitious movements). hydrocephalus in 5.6%, chronic constipation. The syndrome was first reported in 2005

Symptoms and signs 

 Eyes issues - high strength glasses, strabismus
 Hypospadias
 Hypermobility
 Hypertonia
 Hearing loss

Diagnosis
A medical examination is recommended for newly diagnosed including echocardiogram for detection of heart defects (mainly aorta dilation), kidneys ultrasound, consider brain MRI.

Treatment
Intensive speech/language therapy was found to be important for maximizing long-term outcomes.

Society and culture
Simon Searchlight is an international patient registry for dup7 patients to help speed up research into neurodevelopmental disorders. By collecting detailed participant information and blood samples, Simons Searchlight takes a deep dive into rare genetic conditions, sharing the data and samples for free with researchers. Participation is open to individuals all over the world who speak English and Spanish (and more languages to come). In the future, it might also contain iPSC which will be generated from these blood samples. Anyone who carries a 7q11.23 duplication can join this registry.

References

External links 
 The first conference on dup7 was held in Washington DC in Jun 2018. Link to the lectures videos

Genetic diseases and disorders